The Copper King Mansion, also known as the W. A. Clark Mansion, is a 34-room residence of Romanesque Revival Victorian architecture that was built from 1884 to 1888 as the Butte, Montana, residence of William Andrews Clark, one of Montana's three famous Copper Kings.  The home features fresco painted ceilings, elegant parquets of rare imported wood, gas and electric chandeliers, ornate hand-carved fireplaces and stairways, and stained-glass windows.  The mansion was added to the National Register of Historic Places in 1970.

The Copper King Mansion has been privately owned, operated, and occupied by the Cote family since 1953. The home is operated as a bed and breakfast. Guided tours are available at 10am,12 ,2,and 3:30pm during the summer tourist season, or by appointment during the winter months. The home underwent restoration in 2012.

The building of the Copper King Mansion is described in the bestselling biography of Clark's daughter, Huguette, Empty Mansions: The Mysterious Life of Huguette Clark and the Spending of a Great American Fortune by Bill Dedman and Paul Clark Newell, Jr.

References

External links

 Copper King Mansion - official site

Victorian architecture in Montana
Romanesque Revival architecture in Montana
Bed and breakfasts in Montana
Houses on the National Register of Historic Places in Montana
Hotels in Montana
Buildings and structures in Butte, Montana
Tourist attractions in Butte, Montana
Historic house museums in Montana
Museums in Butte, Montana
William A. Clark family
Houses in Silver Bow County, Montana
National Register of Historic Places in Silver Bow County, Montana
Houses completed in 1888
Gilded Age mansions